Tanit Jitnukul (Thai: ธนิตย์ จิตนุกูล, born in 1956 in Songkhla Province, Thailand) is a Thai film director, screenwriter and producer. Among his films is the 2000 historical battle epic, Bang Rajan. His nickname is "Pued" (ปืีด).

Biography
Tanit graduated from Siam Vocational School. He started in the movie business as a film-poster artist. In 1985 he was the co-director on Suem Noi Noi Galon Mark Noi ("Happy Go Lucky") with Adirek Wattaleela, better known in Thailand simply as "Uncle". Uncle would go on to produce Bangrajan.

Tanit made his name doing historical battle epics and directing a string of them; Bang Rajan, Legend of the Warlord and Sema: Warrior of Ayutthaya. He has however worked in many genres including horrors (Art of the Devil and Narok), crime-action (102 Bangkok Robbery) and comedy (Andaman Girl).

He won best director honors at the Thailand National Film Awards for Bang Rajan. The film was also screened at the 2000 Fantasia Festival, where it was placed second in the international competition. Bang Rajan was later "presented" by Oliver Stone in a theatrical release in the United States.

Filmography

Director
 Suem Noi Noi Galon Mark Noi(Happy-Go-Lucky) (1985)
 Happy-Go-Lucky 2 (1986)
 Magic Moon (1991)
 Love Affaire (1997)
 Seua Jone Phan Seua (Crime King) (1998)
 Hello Countryside (1999)
 Bang Rajan (2000)
 Kun pan (Legend of the Warlord) (2002)
 Khunsuk (Sema: Warrior of Ayutthaya) (2003)
 Khon len khong (Art of the Devil)
 102 piit krungthep plon (102 Bangkok Robbery) (2004)
 The Lord of Ayuthaya (Jao Tak) (2004; direct-to-video)
 Jee (Andaman Girl) (2005))
 Narok (Hell) (2005)
 Hak yae (Black Night, segment The Lost Memory) (2006)
 Ghost in Law (2008; co-director)
 First Flight (2008)
 Bang Rajan 2 (2010)
 Ghost Day (2012)

Producer
 Muay Thai Chaiya (2007)
 Jee (Andaman Girl) (2005)
 Narok (Hell) (2005)
 14 tula, songkram prachachon (The Moonhunter) (2001)
 The Red Eagle (2010)
 Ghost Day (2012)

Screenwriter
 Bang Rajan (2000)
 Hak yae (Black Night) (2006)
 Ghost Day (2012)

Actor
 Sum muepuen (Hit Man File) (2005)
 Me ... Myself (2007)

External links
 
 Tanit Jitnukul at the Thai Film Database 

1956 births
Living people
Tanit Jitnukul
Tanit Jitnukul
Tanit Jitnukul
Tanit Jitnukul